Avatha heterographa is a species of moth of the family Erebidae. It is found in Myanmar and on Sumatra and Borneo. The habitat consists of montane forests.

References

Moths described in 1912
Avatha
Moths of Asia